Edward Charlton is a former association football player who represented New Zealand at international level.

Charlton played two official A-international matches for the New Zealand in 1960, both against Pacific minnows Tahiti, the first a 5–1 win on 5 September, the second a 2–1 win on 12 September 1960. He scored two of New Zealand's goals in the first game and one in the second for a total of three goals in official matches.

In August 1960 the Christchurch Press ran a detailed brief titled "Miles and Goals" recording Charton's achievements throughout the 1960 season.

References 

Year of birth missing (living people)
Living people
New Zealand association footballers
New Zealand international footballers
Association footballers not categorized by position